The Grammy Legend Award, or the Grammy Living Legend Award, is a special award of merit given to recording artists by the Grammy Awards, a music awards ceremony that was established in 1958. Honors in several categories are presented at the ceremony annually by the National Academy of Recording Arts and Sciences of the United States for outstanding achievements in the music industry.

The first Grammy Legend Awards were issued in 1990 to Smokey Robinson, Willie Nelson, Andrew Lloyd Webber, and Liza Minnelli. The honor was inaugurated to recognize "ongoing contributions and influence in the recording field". The next year, four more musicians (Aretha Franklin, Billy Joel, Johnny Cash and Quincy Jones) were acknowledged with Grammy Legend Awards. The award was given to Barbra Streisand in 1992 and Michael Jackson in 1993.

After 1994, when the American musicians Curtis Mayfield and Frank Sinatra were both issued Grammy Legend Awards, the honors have been given to recording artists intermittently. Italian operatic tenor Luciano Pavarotti was the 1998 recipient of the award. The following year, British singer-songwriter Elton John was recognized with the honor. The Bee Gees became the first recipients of the award in the 21st century when the brothers were acknowledged by the Grammys in 2003. Overall, fourteen solo musicians and one band have received the Grammy Legend Award.

Recipients

See also
List of Grammy Award categories

References

General

Specific

External links
 Official website of the Grammy Awards

 01
Grammy Award categories
Awards established in 1990